Tairoa (Tairora) is a Kainantu language spoken in Papua New Guinea.

Tairoa proper, or North Tairoa, includes dialects Aantantara (Andandara), Arau-Varosia (Arau-Barosia), Arokaara, Saiqora (Sai’ora), Tairora.

South Tairoa,  Omwunra-Toqura, has dialects Aatasaara (Atakara), Haaviqinra-Oraura (Habina-Oraura), Omwunra-Toqura (Obura-To’okena), Vaira-Ntosara (Baira), Veqaura (Meauna), Vinaata-Konkompira (Pinata-Konkombira).

Further reading
Vincent, Alexander. 1973. Notes on Tairora noun morphology. In: McKaughan (ed.), 530–546.
Vincent, Lois E. and Anisi Kaave. 2010. Tairora-English Dictionary. Orlando, FL: Wycliffe.
Gajdusek, D. Carleton. 1980. Territory of Papua New Guinea: Return to New Britain, Kuru Investigations in the Okapa Region, Kukukuku Studies and a Journey through Genatei, Awa, Oweina-Waisara and Pinata-Tairora Villages. December 25, 1963 to April 13, 1964. Bethesda, Maryland: National Institute of Neurological Diseases and Stroke. (contains a word list of South Tairora)

References

External links 
 Paradisec has two collections of Arthur Cappell's materials (AC1, AC2) that include North Tairoa language materials.
 Tairora-English Dictionary
 Tairora word list

Kainantu–Goroka languages
Languages of Eastern Highlands Province